
Płońsk County is a unit of territorial administration and local government (powiat) in Masovian Voivodeship, east-central Poland. It came into being on January 1, 1999, as a result of the Polish local government reforms passed in 1998.

As of 2019 its total population is 87,183, out of which the population of Płońsk is 22,130, that of Raciąż is 4,384, and the rural population is 60,669.

Neighbouring counties
Płońsk County is bordered by Mława County and Ciechanów County to the north, Pułtusk County to the east, Nowy Dwór County to the south-east, Sochaczew County to the south, Płock County and Sierpc County to the west, and Żuromin County to the north-west.

Administrative division
The county is subdivided into 12 gminas (two urban and 10 rural). These are listed in the following table, in descending order of population.

References

 
Land counties of Masovian Voivodeship